Giovanni Galeone (born 25 January 1941) is an Italian football manager and former player.

Playing career
Galeone, born in Naples, moved to Northern Italy in his youth years, and played as a midfielder for Ponziana Trieste, Monza and Udinese, where he spent most of his playing career.

Managerial career
Galeone started his coaching career at 34 for Serie D team Pordenone, in 1975–76, obtaining an eleventh place in his debut season. His first coaching experience in a professional league came in the 1978–79 season for Cremonese of Serie C1, but ended with a sacking. After a few other experiences, including three fairly successful seasons at SPAL of Serie C1, in 1986–87 Galeone signed for Serie B team Pescara, the team whose name is associated with him still today. In his debut season with Pescara, Galeone won Serie B and led his team directly to Serie A , and managed to save Pescara from relegation the following season for the first time ever for his side. He left Pescara in 1988–89, after having failed to avoid relegation for his second time, but returned in 1990–91 and regained promotion to Serie A in 1991–92. Other than Pescara, where he coached also in 1999–2000 and 2000–01, Galeone served as head coach for Udinese Calcio in 1994–95, obtaining a Serie A promotion, Perugia in 1995–96, where he obtained his fourth and final Serie A promotion, Napoli in 1997–98 and Ancona in 2003–04. In 2006, Galeone made his comeback at Udinese, as he was called to replace Loris Dominissini and Néstor Sensini at the helm of the bianconeri.

Galeone is well known for being a strong advocate for the 4–3–3 formation, zonal marking, and an attacking style of playing, which made of him one of the most innovative Italian football coaches in the late 1980s alongside Arrigo Sacchi. At 65, he had been the oldest active head coach in the 2006–07 Serie A, before being fired on 16 January after disagreements with the club.

On 19 July 2007, he was announced to make a fourth comeback at Pescara, this time as technical consultant beside new boss Andrea Camplone, a former player of his in the 1990s, but left the club only one month later.

References

External links
 Galeone fan site

Living people
1941 births
Italian footballers
Association football midfielders
Italian football managers
Udinese Calcio managers
Delfino Pescara 1936 managers
A.C. Perugia Calcio managers
S.S.C. Napoli managers
Udinese Calcio players
Serie A managers
Footballers from Naples
A.C. Monza players
A.C. Ancona managers
Como 1907 managers